The Lowell family is one of the Boston Brahmin families of New England, known for both intellectual and commercial achievements.

The family had emigrated to Boston from England in 1639, led by the patriarch Percival Lowle (c. 1570–1664/1665). The surname was spelt in many ways until it was standardised as Lowell from about 1721, apparently by the Rev. John Lowell. It was a later John Lowell (1743–1802) from whom the famous dynasty was descended.

Background
The Lowells originally settled on the North Shore at Cape Ann after they arrived in Boston on June 23, 1639. The patriarch, Percival Lowle, was born in Portbury before possibly becoming a merchant in Bristol and later arriving in the New World.

By the 19th and 20th centuries, the Lowells descended from John Lowell (1743–1802) were widely considered to be one of America's most accomplished families.

Massachusetts Bay Colony Governor John Winthrop needed solid, dependable people to settle the North Shore area as a buffer against the French from Canada and urged that the Lowells relocate to Newburyport on the Merrimack River, at the border of the failing Province of Maine.

Ancestry in the UK

Origin of the name

Many suggestions about the origins of the medieval name Lowle were offered during the late 20th century. Some argued that it was Welsh or Saxon while others supported the name was of Norman origin. One possibility is that it originates from the Latin word lupellus (wolf-cub) from Latin lupus (wolf).

Lowell family historian Delmar R. Lowell, gave much weight and persuasion to the origins of the name Lowle in his work and he and others concluded the Lowles of England were unquestionably of Norman descent.

There were still Louels in Scotland on the Scottish Marches in the Royal Burgh of Roxburgh when Edward Longshanks, King of England, ordered the nobility and gentry in Scotland to swear an oath of allegiance to him in the Ragman Roll in 1291. It is during this period, in 1288, that the earliest documentation for the name Lowle appears. William Lowle of Yardley in Worcestershire is documented as a yeoman, and standing as a witness to a border dispute between two of his neighbours. It is from this period that Delmar Lowell traces the descent of the Lowles through England until their departure for the colonies.

Documentation for this period also exists in The National Archives of England showing that there were also Lowels in the Welsh Marches. In 1317, William de Braose, 2nd Baron Braose petitioned King Edward II, the King's Council, and the Parliament to request that Roger Mortimer, 1st Earl of March send two justices to arrest and bring to trial 200–300 men he accused of attacking his Knights and Ministers and for, "trespasses made against the King's peace to Brewose and his people of Gower.", a peninsula, part of Glamorgan in Wales. Members named in this band of men included Ieuan and Griffith Lowel for the attack at Eynon.

Coat of arms

The Harleian Society, a British publisher of the official Royal Heraldic visitations, describes the Lowle Coate of Arms from the herald's records taken in Somersetshire in the years 1573, 1591, and 1623.
 Blazon: Sable, a dexter hand couped at the wrist grasping three darts, one in pale and two in saltire, all in argent.
 Crest: A Stag's head cabossed, between the attires a pheon azure.
 Motto: Occasionem Cognosce (oh-kay-see-OH-nem kogg-NOHS-keh).

The coat of arms has a shield with black field displaying a right hand cut-off at the wrist and grabbing three arrows, one vertical and two crossed diagonally, in silver; above the shield is a male deer's head with a barbed, broad arrowhead in blue between its antlers. A loose translation of the family motto is Know Your Opportunity.

The use of the Lowle Coat of Arms has varied slightly between the generations; some families omitted the pheon azure or substituted blunted bolts for the pointed darts; and one generation, notably a pastor, used an urn in his families crest instead of the stag's head. The right for a man to bear arms traditionally passes from father to eldest son; occasionally subsequent generations change the Coat of Arms to reflect their lives or vocations better, sometimes even "quartering" their Coat of Arms with another family by way of marriage.

Some believe that the Lowle Coat of Arms fell into abeyance when Percival Lowle and his sons emigrated to Massachusetts. They were still subjects of the Crown and its favor until the colonies declared Independence from Britain in 1776 and were entitled to bear their Coat of Arms. Also, there were a number of Lowles who remained in England who could claim the right.

Lowle to Lowell
After Percival Lowle emigrated to the New World with his sons and after some subsequent generations Lowle became Lowell. Delmar Lowell suggests that Rev. John Lowell was the catalyst in getting the Lowell family into cohesion regarding the spelling of the surname sometime after 1721. At the time, Lowells all over New England spelled their names as many different ways as there were branches. Some spelled their surname Lowel, Lowle, Lowell, Lowl, and some spelled it Louell, and Louel even after arriving in the new world. Spelling was so poorly controlled that some early wills show one son with the name Lowle while another son is Lowel and the wife as Lowell all in the same document. It's unlikely that one member of the family had such a big impact on the name. He may well have influenced many Lowells in America to be consistent, but documentation shows that Lowles in England started spelling their name Lowell around this time as well. By the mid 18th century in England there are plenty of documents for Lowells and none for the prior spellings. This suggests that the proliferation of literacy and a trend to standardize the English language caused members of the family on both sides of the Atlantic to adopt the phonetic spelling.

Family tree
The Lowell family of Boston was traditionally known as the descendants of John Lowell (1743–1802) of Newburyport. His descendants were the Lowells,  well known as members of the Boston Brahmins.

 John Lowell (1743–1802), Member of the Continental Congress and Federal Judge
 John Lowell (1769–1840), lawyer and Federalist
 John Amory Lowell (1798–1881), industrialist, philanthropist
 John Lowell (1824–1897), Federal Judge
 John Lowell (1856–1922), lawyer
 Mary Emlen Lowell (1884–1975), Countess of Berkeley, m. Randall Thomas Mowbray Berkeley, 8th Earl of Berkeley
 Ralph Lowell (1890–1978), philanthropist, founder of WGBH and PBS
 Olivia Lowell (1898–1977), m. Augustus Thorndike (1896–1986)
 James Lowell (1869–1933), Federal Judge
 Augustus Lowell (1830–1900), industrialist, philanthropist m. Katherine Bigelow Lawrence (1832–1896), daughter of Abbott Lawrence, Ambassador to the United Kingdom, congressman, industrialist, and original founder of the Harvard School of Engineering
 Percival Lowell (1855–1916), astronomer
 Abbott Lawrence Lowell (1856–1943), President of Harvard University, 1909–33
 Katharine Lowell (1858–1925), m. Alfred Roosevelt (1856–1891), banker, director of Roosevelt & Son, and Gallatin National Bank
  Elfrida Roosevelt (1883–1963), m. Sir Orme Bigland Clarke, 4th Baronet, military officer
  Sir Humphrey Clarke, 5th Baronet (1906–1973)
  Sir Toby Clarke, 6th Baronet (1939–2019), British businessman
  Theodora Roosevelt Clarke (1985–), United Kingdom parliamentarian
  Sir Lawrence Clarke, 7th Baronet (1990–), Olympic hurdler and investment banker
  Major James Alfred Roosevelt (1885–1919), military officer and engineer, awarded the Silver Star for valor during the Meuse–Argonne offensive  
  Katharine Roosevelt (1887–1961), m. Josiah Stanley Reeve, sportsman and foxhunter 
 Elizabeth Lowell (1862–1935), m. William Lowell Putnam (see below)
 George Putnam (1889–1960), founder of Putnam Investments
 Katherine Putnam (1890–1983), m. Harvey Bundy (1888–1963)
 William Bundy (1917–2000), foreign affairs advisor to John F. Kennedy and Lyndon Johnson
 McGeorge Bundy (1919–1996), U.S. National Security Advisor
  Katharine Lawrence Bundy (1923–2014), m. Hugh Auchincloss Jr. (1915–1998), 1st cousin once removed of Hugh D. Auchincloss
  Hugh Auchincloss III (b. 1949), m. Laurie Hollis Glimcher (b. 1951), divorced; daughter of Melvin J. Glimcher
  Jacob Daniel Auchincloss (b. 1988),  U.S. Representative for Massachusetts's 4th congressional district since 2021
  Roger Putnam (1893–1972), Mayor of Springfield, Director of the Economic Stability Administration (ESA)
  Amy Lowell (1874–1925), Pulitzer Prize-winning poet
 Francis Cabot Lowell (1775–1817), pioneer textile industrialist
 John Lowell, Jr. (1799–1836), Founder of the Lowell Institute
  Francis Cabot Lowell, Jr. (1803–1874), industrialist
 George Gardner Lowell (1830–1885)
  Francis Cabot Lowell (1855–1911), Federal Judge
  Edward Jackson Lowell (1845–1894), historian
  Guy Lowell (1870–1927), architect
  Frederick Eldridge Lowell (1874–1933), landscape painter
  Mariana Lowell (1904–1979) m. Jacques Barzun (1907–2012), historian
  Roger Barzun (1941–), lawyer
  Matthew Barzun (1970–), Ambassador to the United Kingdom and Sweden m. Brooke Brown
 Rebecca Russell Lowell (1779–1853), m. Samuel Pickering Gardner (1767–1843)
  John Lowell Gardner (1804–1884)
  John Lowell Gardner (1837–1898), m. Isabella Stewart (1840–1924)
  Charles Lowell (1782–1861), Unitarian minister
 Charles Russell Lowell (1807–1870)
 Charles Russell Lowell, Jr. (1835–1864), Civil War general, m. Josephine Shaw
  Harriet Lowell (1836–1920), m. George Putnam (1834–1917)
 William Lowell Putnam (1861–1923), lawyer and banker, m. Elizabeth Lowell (see above)
 Mary Traill Spence Lowell Putnam (1810–1898), author, translator
 Robert Traill Spence Lowell (1816–1891)
  Robert T.S. Lowell (1860–1887)
  Robert T.S. Lowell (1887–1950), naval officer
  Robert Lowell (1917–1977), Pulitzer Prize–winning poet
  James Russell Lowell (1819–1891), American Romantic poet, Ambassador to Spain and England

Notable Lowells
 Abbott Lawrence Lowell, lawyer, historian, philanthropist, and former President of Harvard University
 Amy Lowell, poet, critic, publisher, and sister of Abbott Lawrence and Percival Lowell
 Augustus Lowell, businessman, philanthropist, and father of Percival, Abbott Lawrence, and Amy Lowell
 Carey Lowell, model, actress and philanthropist
 Charles Russell Lowell, Sr., Unitarian pastor, son of The Old Judge, father of James Russell, and great-great grandfather of Robert Lowell
 Charles Russell Lowell, Union General and Civil War hero
 Delmar R. Lowell, pastor, Civil War veteran, and genealogist
 Edward Jackson Lowell, author and father of Guy Lowell
 Francis Cabot Lowell (1775–1817), businessman and namesake of Lowell, Massachusetts
 Francis Cabot Lowell (1855–1911), U.S. Congressman and Federal Judge
 Guy Lowell, architect and landscape designer
 James Russell Lowell, poet, critic, publisher, abolitionist, Harvard professor, and foreign diplomat
 Joan Lowell, actress and newspaper reporter
 Rev. John Lowell, colonial era Massachusetts minister
 John Lowell aka The Old Judge, Federal Judge appointed by President George Washington and American Revolutionary
 John Lowell, Jr., aka The Boston Rebel, Federalist lawyer and son of The Old Judge
 John Lowell, Jr. Son of Industrialist Francis Cabot Lowell and founder of the Lowell Institute
 John Amory Lowell, businessman and philanthropist
 Judge John Lowell, Federal judge and son of John Amory Lowell
 Josephine Shaw Lowell, sister of Civil War hero Robert Gould Shaw, first woman to hold a public office in New York City, and wife of Gen. Charles Russell Lowell
 Maria White Lowell, poet, abolitionist, and wife of James Russell Lowell
 Percival Lowell, author, astronomer, founder of Lowell Observatory, and brother of Amy and Abbott Lawrence Lowell
 Ralph Lowell, businessman, philanthropist, and founding force behind Boston's WGBH public television
 Robert Lowell, poet and lecturer

Other notable descendants:
 Sir Cuthbert Ackroyd, 1st Baronet, Lord Mayor of London (1955–56)
 Godfrey Lowell Cabot, businessman and philanthropist
 Julian Lowell Coolidge, mathematician
 Abbott Lowell Cummings, noted Yale architectural historian
 John Lowell Gardner II, art collector
 William Lowell Putnam, banker, lawyer, and philanthropist
 William Lowell Putnam III alpinist, broadcasting executive
 Ava Lowle Willing, Philadelphia socialite and ex-wife of John Jacob Astor IV (RMS Titanic casualty)
 Robert Warren Miller, champion sailor and founder of DFS Group
 Marie-Chantal, Crown Princess of Greece
 Princess Maria-Olympia of Greece and Denmark
 Prince Constantine Alexios of Greece and Denmark, future titular King of Greece

Other descendants of Percival Lowle: 
 McGeorge Bundy, former National Security Advisor to Presidents John F. Kennedy and Lyndon Johnson
 Dick Cheney, Ex-Vice President of the United States
 Herman Melville, author
 John Lothrop Motley, historian
 Tuesday Weld, actress
 Tennessee Williams, playwright
 William Whipple, signer of the United States Declaration of Independence
 T. S. Eliot, poet
 Edward Arlington Robinson, poet
 Elliot Richardson, United States Attorney General
 Jerome Napoleon Bonaparte, son of Jerome Bonaparte, King of Westphalia
 Jerome Napoleon Bonaparte II, soldier, officer of the Legion of Honour
 Charles Joseph Bonaparte, United States Attorney General and Secretary of the Navy in, his distant relative by marriage, Theodore Roosevelt's cabinet

Portrait gallery

See also
 First Families of Boston
 Lowell disambiguation page

References

External links
 The Historic Genealogy of the Lowells of America from 1639 to 1899 is available for free download at Google Books.
 Domesday Books The National Archives, England
 The Ragman Roll
 
 

People from Massachusetts
American families of English ancestry
Boston Brahmins